EBJ may refer to:

 Esbjerg Airport in Denmark
 European Biophysics Journal
 Canadian Tabby Cat
 Eddie Bernice Johnson, United States Congresswoman from Texas